This is a chronological list of commanders of the International Space Station. A pre-decided inhabitant of the ISS assumes command upon departure of the previous commander, at the end of an expedition, in a small hand-over ceremony. Their responsibility is defined by the ISS Code of Conduct, which states that the ISS commander has some authority over the operations of the ISS, but should ultimately defer most decisions to the Flight Director.

The commander keeps a symbolic key of the station with them during their tenure, that is, a copy of the handle opening the hatches to the Russian segment. It is passed on to a new astronaut when they replace the existing commander as the new station commander.

Continued international collaboration on ISS missions has been thrown into doubt by the 2022 Russian invasion of Ukraine and related sanctions on Russia.

Responsibilities
 Conduct operations in or on the ISS as directed by the Flight Director and in accordance with the Flight Rules, plans and procedures
 Direct the activities of the ISS crewmembers as a single, integrated team to ensure the successful completion of the mission
 Fully and accurately inform the Flight Director, in a timely manner, of the ISS vehicle configuration, status, commanding, and other operational activities on-board (including off-nominal or emergency situations)
 Enforce procedures for the physical and information security of operations and utilization data
 Maintain order
 Ensure crew safety, health and well-being including crew rescue and return
 Take all reasonable action necessary for the protection of the ISS elements, equipment, or payloads

List

References:

Statistics

A Russian national has commanded the station 31 times, including the current one. 
A US national has commanded the station 28 times.
Japanese and Italian nationals have commanded the station 2 times. 
Belgian, British, Canadian, German and French nationals have commanded the station once each.

Gennady Padalka has commanded the station on 4 separate occasions, more than any other inhabitant.

Fyodor Yurchikhin has commanded the station thrice. Scott Kelly, Oleg Kononenko, Oleg Kotov, Anton Shkaplerov, Pavel Vinogradov, Peggy Whitson and Jeffrey Williams have commanded the station twice each.

See also

 List of International Space Station expeditions
 List of human spaceflights to the International Space Station
 List of Soyuz missions
 Uncrewed spaceflights to the International Space Station
 List of Mir expeditions

References

Footnotes 

International Space Station commanders